Stay Up Late is a 1992 erotic furry watercolor painting by Brian Swords. The painting depicts two nude anthropomorphic white rats embracing on a bed, with a bottle of K-Y Jelly and a used ashtray behind them. It was originally sold in a 1992 TV art auction on WITF, a public station in central Pennsylvania, and gained prominence in 2020 when television host John Oliver purchased and subsequently exhibited the painting on Last Week Tonight.

History

Creation 
Stay Up Late was painted in 1992 by Brian Swords (also known as Biohazard), a furry fandom artist living in York, Pennsylvania. It was one of several of Swords's paintings, such as The Smell of Wet Fur and Sheets and Pillowcases, that depict anthropomorphic rats named Alice and Bob in sexually suggestive poses. Between 1988 and 1993, Swords donated his paintings to "Gallery 33", WITF-TV's yearly auction. His pieces sold well, but the donated paintings steadily became more explicit. Out of fear of alienating their audience and losing their FCC licence, erotica was banned from the auction in 1993.

The painting was sold for $80 to an unknown buyer in 1992.

Purchase by John Oliver 
In the 29 March 2020 episode of Last Week Tonight, John Oliver offered to buy the painting for $1,000 and a $20,000 donation to a local food bank of the owner's choice. Two weeks later, on 12 April 2020, Oliver was shown with the painting as part of his closing monologue of the episode. The seller remains anonymous, but did receive the $1,000, and Oliver did not mention which food bank received the donation, except that it was in Pennsylvania. 

The point of Oliver's stunt was to show how much easier it is to buy a particular painting from an unknown artist than it is to get tested for COVID-19. Emily Chambers, writing for politics blog Pajiba, referred to the extended joke as "greatest story of the past century." Virginia Streva, writing for Philly Voice, called the quest for the painting a "comedic victory."

Later appearances 
In the 4 October 2020 episode, which included a segment on the difficulties that small museums were having as a result of the COVID-19 pandemic, Oliver offered the painting, alongside two other pieces (a portrait of broadcaster Wendy Williams eating a lamb chop, and a painting by Judith Kudlow of her husband's assorted ties), as a travelling exhibit on a national tour. Museums were invited to apply to display the paintings, with the five chosen not only allowed to exhibit them for two weeks, but also receiving $10,000, plus a matching donation to a local food bank.

In the 8 November 2020 episode, Oliver displayed Stay Up Late again in reference to alleged voter fraud in the 2020 U.S. presidential election, and the Trump campaign's creation of a fraud report hotline. Oliver noted that ratfucking is a slang term for electoral fraud, and joked that anyone with "images of Pennsylvania-based ratfucking" should submit them to the hotline's website immediately. The painting also appeared briefly on the 19 June 2022 episode covering high rent prices in the United States.

References

1992 paintings
American paintings
Erotic art
Furry fandom
Last Week Tonight with John Oliver
Watercolor paintings
Mice and rats in art